Vayssierea cinnabarea is a species of minute sea slug, a dorid nudibranch in the gastropod family Okadaiidae.

Range
This species occurs in New Zealand.

Ecology 
This species feeds on Spirorbis tube worms.

Taxonomy 
Although Vayssierea cinnabarea is accepted as a separate species by many individuals, there are some that argue that all Veyssierea should be under one species name, V. felis.

References

 Spencer H.G., Willan R.C., Marshall B.A. & Murray T.J. (2011) Checklist of the Recent Mollusca Recorded from the New Zealand Exclusive Economic Zone

Okadaiidae
Gastropods described in 1944